(born August 14, 1970 in Osaka Prefecture, Japan) is a retired Japanese male freestyle swimmer. He represented Japan in two consecutive Summer Olympics, starting in 1988. His best Olympic result was the 16th place (15:40.94) in the Men's 1500 metres Freestyle event at the 1992 Summer Olympics in Barcelona, Spain.

References
 sports-reference

1970 births
Living people
Olympic swimmers of Japan
Swimmers at the 1988 Summer Olympics
Swimmers at the 1992 Summer Olympics
Sportspeople from Osaka Prefecture
Asian Games medalists in swimming
Swimmers at the 1990 Asian Games
Japanese male freestyle swimmers
Asian Games bronze medalists for Japan
Medalists at the 1990 Asian Games
20th-century Japanese people